Adel Rootstein (1930 – 20 September 1992) was a British mannequin designer responsible for premium designs that are sold worldwide.

Early life
Rootstein was born in Warmbaths, South Africa in 1930. She married the industrial designer Richard Hopkins. Rootstein started by making window displays, which gave her an understanding of "the void that had existed between fashion coverage in the international media & what actually happened in windows."

Mannequins
Rootstein started making mannequins in the kitchen of her basement flat in Earls Court in 1956. She first hired sculptor John Taylor and model Imogen for her first mannequin, placed in a reclining position. This was the start of her first collection, called "GoGo".
Rootstein has been called the "Rolls-Royce" of mannequin makers, and later used well-known singers and actresses as models for her mannequins; Cher, Joan Collins and Twiggy among them.

Rootstein Hopkins Foundation
In 1990, Rootstein and her husband Rick Hopkins set up the Rootstein Hopkins Foundation to assist young artists and designers. The mannequin business was sold in 1991 and Rootstein died in London on 20 September 1992.

References

External links
Fashion Windows
FIDM
Adel Rootstein Official site

1930 births
1992 deaths
British designers